Mirjam Ott (born 27 January 1972 in Bern, Switzerland) is a retired Swiss curler who lives in Laax, Switzerland. She is the 2012 World Curling Champion skip. She is the skip (captain) of the Swiss Olympic Curling Team. She has participated in several Olympic Games contests and has won numerous awards in many other curling events worldwide.

Career
Ott won the Olympic silver medal twice; in the 2002 Olympic Games in Salt Lake City (with skip Luzia Ebnöther) and 2006 in Turin (as skip herself), making her the first woman with two Olympic medals in curling. In 2008 the team won the European Championship in Sweden. At the 2010 Vancouver Olympic Games, her team finished a disappointing fourth place, as Ott's touch completely deserted her late in the semi-final and bronze medal matches. Ott won the 2012 Ford World Women's Curling Championship after defeating Sweden's Margaretha Sigfridsson in the final.

At the 2014 Sochi Olympic Games, Ott skipped her team to a second consecutive fourth-place finish at the Olympic Winter Games. Switzerland were beaten 6-5 by Great Britain in the Bronze Medal match.

Teams

Grand Slam record

References
 
 Team Davos iFAS

Swiss female curlers
1972 births
Living people
Sportspeople from Bern
Curlers at the 2002 Winter Olympics
Curlers at the 2006 Winter Olympics
Curlers at the 2010 Winter Olympics
Curlers at the 2014 Winter Olympics
Olympic curlers of Switzerland
Olympic silver medalists for Switzerland
Olympic medalists in curling
World curling champions
Medalists at the 2006 Winter Olympics
Medalists at the 2002 Winter Olympics
Continental Cup of Curling participants
Swiss curling coaches
European curling champions
Swiss curling champions
21st-century Swiss women